Edita Angyalová (born 8 August 1979 in Košice) is a Slovak politician, former MP of the National Council. In 2002, she was elected to parliament on the Direction – Slovak Social Democracy list at the age of 23 after winning an essay competition organized by the party while still studying Business at the University of Economics in Bratislava along with another winner Róbert Madej. She was not reelected in the 2006 Slovak parliamentary election, but gained a mandate as a replacement for Marek Maďarič, who gave up his mandate to serve as the Minister of Culture. On 30 April 2007, she gave up her mandate and left politics to pursue a career in the private sector. In 2012 she became the first female Slovak politician to come out as homosexual, admitting she had previously quit politics to avoid negative spotlight on her personal life.

References

Direction – Social Democracy politicians
Living people
1979 births
Politicians from Košice
Lesbian politicians
Members of the National Council (Slovakia) 2002-2006
Members of the National Council (Slovakia) 2006-2010
Slovak LGBT politicians
University of Economics in Bratislava alumni
LGBT legislators
Female members of the National Council (Slovakia)